The Reserve Infantry Division of Yanbian() was a reserve infantry formation of the People's Liberation Army active between 1983 and 1998.

The division, then named as the Reserve Division of Yanbian() was activated in July 1983 in Yanbian, Jilin. The division was then composed of:
1st Regiment - Tumen
2nd Regiment - Helong
3rd Regiment
Artillery Regiment - Longjing

As of its activation, the division had 13,361 personnel.

The division was redesignated as the Reserve Garrison Division of Yanbian() in 1985, and was further redesignated as the Reserve Infantry Division of Yanbian in 1991.

In August 1998, the division merged with the 47th Infantry Division as the 47th Reserve Infantry Division of Jilin Provincial Military District.

References

Reserve divisions of the People's Liberation Army
Military units and formations established in 1983